San Andrés y Sauces is a municipality on the island of La Palma, Province of Santa Cruz de Tenerife, Canary Islands, Spain. It is situated in the northeastern part of the island. The population of the municipality is 4,473 (2013) and the area is 42.75 km². The elevation of the largest village Los Sauces is 250 m. Los Sauces is 14 km north of the island capital Santa Cruz de La Palma. The municipality takes its name from the villages Los Sauces (the seat of the municipality) and San Andrés, 1.5 km southeast of Los Sauces, at the coast.

Economy
The main crops are bananas and the root vegetable taro (Colocasia esculenta), locally called ñame. A minor crop is sugar cane, which serves for the only distillery in the land that manufactures Ron Aldea, a rum.

Points of interest
the laurel forest of Los Tilos
traditional architecture, mainly in San Andrés
Puerto Spíndola, a small fishing port
Cuevas de los Murciélagos, volcanic caves that are home to several bat species. Interesting fossils were found in the 1980s.

Historical population

Gallery

See also
List of municipalities in Santa Cruz de Tenerife

References 

Municipalities in La Palma